Dmitry Yudin (born July 31, 1995) is a Russian professional ice hockey defenceman. He is currently playing with Ak Bars Kazan of the Kontinental Hockey League (KHL).

Yudin made his Kontinental Hockey League debut playing with SKA Saint Petersburg during the 2013–14 KHL season. On June 30, 2017, Yudin was traded by SKA to HC Spartak Moscow in exchange for financial compensation prior to the 2017–18 season.

At the beginning of the 2018–19 season, before making his season debut, Yudin was traded by Spartak to reigning champions, Ak Bars Kazan, in exchange for Yaroslav Kosov on September 3, 2018.

Awards and honors

References

External links

1995 births
Living people
Ak Bars Kazan players
Russian ice hockey defencemen
SKA Saint Petersburg players
HC Spartak Moscow players
People from Nizhny Tagil
Sportspeople from Sverdlovsk Oblast